Caleb Suri is a retired American soccer player who played professionally in the North American Soccer League, Major Indoor Soccer League, American Indoor Soccer Association and USISL.

In 1984, Suri, older brother of Mo Suri, graduated from Don Antonio Lugo High School.  In May 1984, the San Diego Sockers of the North American Soccer League signed Suri to an apprentice contract.  He played six games during the outdoor season.  He went on to play two seasons with the Sockers in the Major Indoor Soccer League.  In 1985, he played on loan with the Tulsa Roughnecks who were playing an independent exhibition schedule.  In 1986, he played for the San Diego Nomads of the Western Soccer Alliance.  In the fall of 1986, Suri signed as a free agent with the Louisville Thunder of the American Indoor Soccer Association.  When the Thunder folded, the Milwaukee Wave selected him in the dispersal draft.  He played sixteen games for the Wave during the 1987–1988 AISA season.  On October 27, 1988, Suri signed with the Dayton Dynamo.  The Dynamo released him at the end of the season and he joined the Atlanta Attack on January 10, 1990.  In 1991, Suri signed with the expansion Atlanta Magic of the USISL.  In 1994, the Magic began playing outdoors in addition to its indoor seasons.  In 1995, he played for the Chattanooga Express.  He returned to the Magic in the fall of 1995 as a player-coach.  In 1996, he played for the Atlanta Ruckus in the A-League.  He retired at the end of the season.

References

External links
 NASL/MISL stats

1966 births
Living people
A-League (1995–2004) players
American soccer coaches
American soccer players
American Indoor Soccer Association players
Atlanta Attack players
Atlanta Magic players
Atlanta Silverbacks players
Dayton Dynamo players
Chattanooga Express players
Louisville Thunder players
Major Indoor Soccer League (1978–1992) players
Milwaukee Wave players
North American Soccer League (1968–1984) players
San Diego Sockers (original MISL) players
San Diego Sockers (NASL) players
Nomads Soccer Club players
Tulsa Roughnecks (1978–1984) players
USISL coaches
USISL players
Western Soccer Alliance players
Association football forwards
Association football defenders
Soccer players from California